Enrico Cester (born ) is an Italian male volleyball player. He was part of the Italy men's national volleyball team. On club level he plays for Cucine Lube Civitanova.

Sporting achievements

Clubs

FIVB Club World Championship
  Poland 2017 – with Cucine Lube Civitanova
  Poland 2018 – with Cucine Lube Civitanova

Silver medal with Cucine Lube Civitanova- 2018

CEV Champions League
  2015/2016 - with Cucine Lube Civitanova
  2016/2017 - with Cucine Lube Civitanova

National championships
 2016/2017  Italian Championship, with Cucine Lube Civitanova
 2022/2023  Italian Cup, with Gas Sales Bluenergy Piacenza

References

External links
 profile at FIVB.org

1988 births
Living people
Italian men's volleyball players
Place of birth missing (living people)